Galeria Karstadt Kaufhof GmbH, based in Essen, Germany, is the second largest department store group in Europe, with 131 locations and 18,000 employees. The company was formed in 2018 with the merger of two of Germany's most historic department store chains, Galeria Kaufhof and Karstadt. On August 20, 2021, it was announced that all stores of both chains would be rebranded as Galeria. The first three stores and the online store were rebranded on October 27, 2021, with remaining stores following.

The company suffered during the COVID-19 pandemic and in 2020 announced plans to close 62 of its 172 stores. In January 2022, it received €250 million in federal aid, after having received a €460 million loan from the economic stabilization fund in 2021. In November, the chain announced it had filed for the German equivalent of insolvency for a second time and planned to close a third of its 131 locations.

References

External links

 

German companies established in 2018
Companies based in Essen
Retail companies of Germany
Department stores of Germany